The Voice of China ( or ), a.k.a. CNR-1, is the flagship radio channel of China National Radio (CNR). It provides news and commentaries and broadcast 24 hours a day (exc. BJT 2:05-4:25 on Tuesday) via AM, FM, SW and Internet.

History
The infrastructure began with a transmitter from Moscow to set up its first station in Yan'an (延安).  It used the call sign XNCR ("New China Radio") for broadcasts, and is the first radio station set up by the Communist Party of China in 1940. In the west, it was known as the Yan'an New China Radio Station broadcasting two hours daily.  In China, it was called the Yan'an Xinhua Broadcasting Station, which was established on December 30, 1940.

On March 11, 1947, it was renamed Shanbei Xinhua Broadcasting Station after it departed from Yan'an. It began to broadcast in Peiping under the name of Peiping Xinhua Broadcasting Station on March 25, 1949. On December 5, 1949, it was officially renamed  Central People's Broadcasting Station 1st Program, two months after the establishment of the People's Republic of China.

On January 1, 2004, CNR-1 was rebranded as The Voice of China.

Frequency
All units of below numbers are Kilohertz (kHz), except FM radios which are Megahertz (mHz). Many of these shortware or medium wave frequencies may also be used as jamming frequency to hold up remote devices from receiving signals of the Voice of America, Radio Free Asia, Radio Taiwan International, etc.

Shortwave (SW) 
(DRM radio frequencies are marked bold)
6030, 6075, 6105, 6145, 6180, 7300, 9455, 9470, 9540, 9655, 9660, 9680, 9735, 9870, 9900, 11605, 11640, 11695, 13825, 15370, 15320, 15465, 15735, 17770, 17790, 17800, 17830, 21555

Part of these SW frequencies may temporary shut down during PM 14:00-17:00 on every Tuesday

Medium wave (MW) 
 540 (nationalwide, mainly in Changsha, Dandong, Fuzhou, Guiyang, Liaoyang, Shanghai, Shenyang, Xi'an, Yingkou, and Zhuzhou, also available in Lianjiang County of Taiwan)
 603 (in Chenzhou, Hengyang, Yongzhou, and Huaihua)
 612 (in Chaozhou, signal launches by Shanmen Village of Raoping County with 3 kW launching power)
 639 (nationalwide, mainly in Beijing, Chengdu, Nanning, and Panjin, signal launches by 542 launch pad of NRTA with 200 kW launching power, may cover most of Japan, Korean Peninsula, Mongolia and Russian Far East in the night)
 648 (in Jinan, signal launches by Qianfoshan MW station)
 756 (nationalwide, mainly in Guangzhou, Haikou, Harbin, Qingdao, and Shaoyang)
 900 (in Benxi (urban area))
 927 (in Yiyang, Yueyang, and Zhuzhou)
 945 (nationalwide)
 981 (nationalwide, mainly in Changchun, Chongqing, Maoming, Nanchang, and Yingkou, signal launches by 561 launch pad of NRTA with 200 kW launching power, may cover Taiwan and Okinawa Prefecture of Japan in the night)
 1008 (nationalwide, mainly in Kunming)
 1035 (nationalwide, mainly in Dalian, Datong, Fuxin, Ganzhou, Huanren (Benxi), Jinzhou Liaoyang, Mudanjiang, Qiqihar, Tieling, Wuhan, Yingkou, and Zhangjiajie, signal launches by 707 launch pad of Jiangxi Radio & TV station with 10 kW launching power)
 1134 (nationalwide)
 1143 (in Chaoyang, Nanning, and Xiangxi)
 1170 (nationalwide, mainly in Huizhou)
 1197 (in Quanzhou and Kinmen of Taiwan)
 1359 (nationalwide, mainly in Chengde, Nanjing, Sanming, Xiamen, and Zhangzhou, also available in Kinmen of Taiwan)
 1377 (nationalwide, mainly in Zhengzhou, signal launches by 554 launch pad of NRTA with 600 kW launching power, may cover part of Japan, South Korea and Taiwan in the night)
 1422 (nationalwide)
 1440 (in Putian and Kinmen of Taiwan)
 1503 (in Nanning)
 1539 (nationalwide)
 1593 (nationalwide, mainly in Changzhou, signal launches by 623 launch pad of NRTA with 400 kW launching power, may cover most of Japan, Korean Peninsula, and west of Taiwan in the night)

FM radio 

 87.2 (in Benxi (urban area))
 87.6 (in Nantong)
 88.1 (in Nanning)
 88.2 (in Panjin)
 88.4 (in Deyang, Xuzhou, and Zhuzhou)
 88.5 (in Zhangjiajie)
 88.6 (in Shigatse and Weinan)
 88.7 (in Urumqi)
 88.8 (in Meizhou)
 89.0 (in Tongchuan)
 89.1 (in Dalian, Nanchang)
 89.2 (in Lhasa)
 89.3 (in Guangzhou, Loudi (05:00-01:00 next day))
 89.4 (in Rizhao, Wuxi)
 89.5 (in Putian and Kinmen of Taiwan)
 89.8 (in Guilin, Jinan)
 89.9 (in Harbin, Meizhou)
 90.0 (in Maoming)
 90.2 (in Chaozhou, Hangzhou, and Pingdingshan)
 90.5 (in Yuxi)
 90.9 (in Xiangxi)
 91.0 (in Zengcheng (Guangzhou))
 91.4 (in Yongxing Island (Sansha))
 91.5 (in Benxi County)
 91.6 (in Xining)
 92.0 (in Chongqing, Yiyang, and Lianjiang County of Taiwan)
 92.3 (in Chaozhou)
 92.4 (in Nanchong)
 92.9 (in Liaoyang)
 93.0 (in Huizhou)
 93.1 (in Qingdao)
 93.2 (in Tangshan)
 93.5 (in Chenzhou, Fuzhou, Hefei, and Lianjiang County of Taiwan)
 93.6 (in Guiyang)
 94.1 (in Shanwei)
 94.3 (in Tieling)
 94.4 (in Jiamusi)
 94.6 (in Luoyang)
 94.7 (in Changde)
 94.8 (in Lanzhou, Shenyang)
 95.0 (in Changsha (05:00-01:00 next day), Hengyang, Shuangfeng (Loudi), Xiangtan, and Zhuzhou)
 95.1 (in Mianyang)
 95.2 (in Huaihua)
 95.3 (in Baoji)
 95.5 (in Sanya)
 95.6 (in Shijiazhuang, Wuhan)
 95.7 (in Ningbo)
 95.8 (in Huizhou, Nanjing, Sanming, Shenzhen, and Hong Kong)
 95.9 (in Ganzhou)
 96.4 (in Qujing, Xi'an, and Yinchuan)
 96.5 (in Qinhuangdao)
 96.7 (in Shaoyang, Weifang)
 96.9 (in Baotou, Quanzhou, and Kinmen of Taiwan)
 97.0 (in Taiyuan)
 97.1 (in Hohhot, Jiayuguan)
 97.4 (in Jining)
 97.7 (in Qiqihar, Yantai, and Zhangzhou)
 97.9 (in Yingkou)
 98.0 (in Jilin)
 98.2 (in Meizhou)
 98.3 (in Jiaxing)
 98.9 (in Tianshui, Yibin)
 99.0 (in Hanzhong, Shanghai)
 99.1 (in Changchun, Guang'an, Shaoyang, Zhuhai and Macau)
 99.2 (in Shannan, Yangshuo (Guilin))
 99.4 (in Shantou, Zigong)
 99.5 (in Zhangjiakou)
 100.0 (in Suzhou)
 100.8 (in Fuxin)
 101.0 (in Anshan)
 101.2 (in Chaoyang, Shilong (Pingdingshan))
 101.4 (in Chengde, Fushun, and Panzhihua)
 101.5 (in Conghua (Guangzhou))
 101.7 (in Zunyi)
 101.8 (in Changzhi, Zhenjiang)
 102.2 (in Changzhou, Jiangmen)
 102.3 (in Jinzhou)
 102.6 (in Xiamen, Zhangzhou, and Kinmen of Taiwan)
 102.7 (in Huanren (Benxi))
 102.9 (in Huludao, Tianjin, and Yan'an)
 103.1 (in Wenzhou)
 103.2 (in Changsha (05:00-23:00), Xiangtan, Yiyang, Yueyang, Yulin, and Zhuzhou)
 103.5 (in Hulunbuir, Zhanjiang)
 103.7 (in Chengdu)
 103.9 (in Daqing, Shaoxing)
 104.7 (in Liuzhou)
 104.8 (in Tongliao)
 104.9 (in Jinzhou, Yangquan)
 105.0 (in Huangshi)
 105.1 (in Xianyang)
 105.2 (in Xiamen and Kinmen of Taiwan)
 105.4 (in Dandong, Loudi (urban area, 05:00-24:00))
 105.6 (in Karamay)
 105.8 (in Haikou)
 106.1 (in Beijing, Zhengzhou)
 106.2 (in Nanning, Weihai)
 106.3 (in Kaifeng)
 106.4 (in Tonghua)
 106.7 (in Baicheng)
 106.8 (in Mudanjiang)
 107.0 (in Kunming)
 107.1 (in Yonghou)
 107.5 (in Jingdezhen, Siping)
 107.6 (in Datong)

Major programs
News and newspapers Summary
National Network News
CNR News

References

Shortwave radio stations
Radio organizations in China
Radio stations established in 1940
China Media Group